The Gesäuse National Park is a national park in the Austrian state of Styria. Located in the mountainous Upper Styrian region, it covers large parts of the Gesäuse range within the Ennstal Alps and the steep water gap of the Enns river between Admont and Hieflau. The area also covers parts of the municipal areas of Johnsbach, Weng, Landl, and Sankt Gallen.

It was established on 26 October 2002.

External links

 

National parks of Austria
Protected areas established in 2002
Ennstal Alps
Geography of Styria
Tourist attractions in Styria
2002 establishments in Austria
Protected areas of the Alps